The Hitchin by-election was a Parliamentary by-election held on 23 November 1911. The constituency returned one Member of Parliament (MP) to the House of Commons of the United Kingdom, elected by the first past the post voting system.

Vacancy
Dr Alfred Peter Hillier had been the Conservative MP for Hitchin since regaining the seat from the Liberals in January 1910. He committed suicide on 24 October 1911 in his home at 20 Eccleston Square, London, England.

Electoral history

Candidates
The new Conservative candidate was Robert Cecil who had been Conservative MP for Marylebone East until January 1910. In 1910 he unsuccessfully contested Blackburn in the January election and Wisbech in the December election.
Thomas Tylston Greg, who had been the Liberal candidate last time was again chosen to contest the seat.

Result

Aftermath
A General Election was due to take place by the end of 1915. By the autumn of 1914, the following candidates had been adopted to contest that election. Due to the outbreak of war, the election never took place.
Unionist: Robert Cecil
Liberal:

References

Hitchin
1911 elections in the United Kingdom
1911 in England
20th century in Hertfordshire
By-elections to the Parliament of the United Kingdom in Hertfordshire constituencies
November 1911 events